Hertford Basin is the first canal basin located on the River Lee Navigation in Hertford, England. It is situated next to Hartham Common, and Hertford Weir.

Marinas_in_England
Tourist attractions in Hertfordshire
Geography_of_Hertfordshire